The 2015 Melaka United Season is Melaka United's 5th season playing football in the Malaysia FAM League since its inception after being relegated from Malaysia Premier League in 2010. They won the league this season and was promoted to Malaysia Premier League next season by topping the Group B table and won the cup by beating Perlis 3-2 in the final.

Malaysia FAM League

League table

Final

Malaysia FA Cup

Melaka United were eliminated in the first round (round of 32) of the 2015 Malaysia FA Cup. They lost 1-3 to Terengganu.

Malaysia Cup
Melaka United does not participated in this year Malaysia Cup as they were not qualified for it.

References

Melaka United F.C.
Melaka United F.C. seasons
Malaysian football clubs 2015 season
Malaysian football club seasons by club